St Blazey engine shed is located in Par, Cornwall, United Kingdom, although it is named after the adjacent village of St Blazey. It was built in 1874 as the headquarters of the Cornwall Minerals Railway but for many years was a depot of the Great Western Railway. The current depot operator (in 2016) is DB Cargo and the depot TOPS code is BZ.

History

St Blazey engine shed dates from the opening of the Cornwall Minerals Railway on 1 June 1874. This line linked Fowey and Newquay via Par in Cornwall. The engineer was Sir Morton Peto and he built workshops for the railway on the north side of Par, close to the adjoining town of St Blazey. The workshops included a distinctive roundhouse engine shed of nine 70 feet long roads around a turntable. Each shed road had a 58 feet long pit between the rails for servicing engines. The area also boasted an erecting and repair shop, a fitting shop, a smithy, boiler house and a 2,500 gallon water tower.

Because of their location, the engine shed was initially known as Par. On 1 January 1879 a loop line was built to the Cornwall Railway station at Par after which the Cornwall Minerals Railway engine shed and adjacent station were known as St Blazey to avoid the confusion of two stations with the same name.

The Cornwall Minerals Railway was operated by the Great Western Railway from October 1877, the GWR shed code being SBZ. A new, elevated coaling road and 45,000 gallon water tank was provided before 1908.

The Great Western Railway was nationalised into British Railways from 1 January 1948 and given the shed code 83E.  The first diesel locomotive was allocated to St Blazey in November 1960. The last steam locomotive workings from the shed were on 28 April 1962 and the shed officially closed to steam that month.

The roundhouse has since been converted into industrial units but since April 1987 the adjacent wagon repair shed has been used to service diesel locomotives, local passenger trains, and wagons used for china clay traffic. British Rail was privatised in the 1990s, the goods traffic and workshops at St Blazey becoming the responsibility of freight operator English Welsh & Scottish Railway (now DB Schenker Rail (UK)).

The turntable has been retained to turn the preserved steam locomotives that still visit Cornwall on special main line workings. It as given listed building status in 1974, and at one time it was listed in Historic England's 'Heritage at Risk Register' as it was deteriorating through lack of maintenance. but it was renovated in 2016 and was used for a special train on 7 August that year.

Goods traffic is still sometimes loaded at St Blazey in the sidings adjacent to the depot.

Allocation and operation

Lines operated by locomotives shedded at St Blazey are mainly the branches from Par to Newquay and associated freight lines and the two lines to Fowey. This resulted in an allocation of locomotives designed for hauling freight trains, and with the tight curves encountered on some of the branches, types with a short wheelbase suitable for such lines were usual. The smallest engine allocated to St Blazey in later years was the tank used for the Lostwithiel to Fowey branch, which was usually four-coupled. Under the GWR a Metro tank was usual but under British Rail an ex-GW 1400 class was used. In 1960, a County class 4-6-0 locomotive was shedded at St Blazey as a trial but was moved away later that year.

Following the change from steam to diesel the allocation of locomotives at St Blazey was only shunters. There were five  shunters allocated to St Blazey by the late 1970s There were three turns for shunters allocated at St Blazey in 1981. One loco was used to shunt St Blazey yard, and a second locomotive was used as trip pilot travelling to Wenfordbridge clay dries Monday/Wednesday/Friday. The third locomotive was a spare used to provide cover for the shunters at both St Blazey and Penzance sheds. This was a dual-braked example to work both the vacuum-braked 'clay hood' wagons commonly used on china clay trains in the St Blazey area and the passenger stock that would be shunted at Penzance. In 1995 there were still three Class 08s, although by now all of these were fitted with air brakes. 

Larger locomotives were never based here but visited from other depots to haul freight trains. Many of these only operated during the week so that at weekends half a dozen locomotives could be at the depot awaiting active duty. Other classes have also been used for local freight trains. The trial was not successful.

Since the demise of British Rail the depot has been operated by English, Welsh & Scottish Railway (EWS, now DB Cargo). There have been no locomotives formally based at St Blazey as all shunters in the EWS Great Western Lines pool were officially allocated to Cardiff Canton depot, although locomotives still used the shed.

The yard was used to store several DMUs overnight for British Rail and later Wessex Trains then Great Western Railway. This meant that several morning services started at Par railway station and evening ones terminated there.

References

Sources

Railway depots in England
Rail transport in Cornwall
Great Western Railway
St Blazey